Katie Holten is a contemporary Irish artist whose artwork focuses on humans' impact on the natural environment.

Career 
Her mother was a gardener and a floral artist. She graduated from National College of Art and Design in Dublin in 1998. In 2004 Holten was awarded a Fulbright Scholarship to develop her practice in New York. In 2002, Holten was awarded €20,000 as the winner of the AIB art awards. Holten was chosen to represent Ireland at the 50th Venice Biennale in 2003.

Work 

Holten's work is often made from recycled materials, and involves maps, plants, and various ecological subjects, provoking a dialogue on issues ranging from biodiversity to global warming.

Drawing is central to Holten's work. She is fascinated by the process of transforming two-dimensional drawings to three-dimensional works. "In a sense, no matter what form they end up taking, all of my works can be considered drawings. I have a wide-open understanding of what drawing is. It's lines created on a page, in space, on screen, on a wall, through walking, flying, talking, via graphite, ink, sand, stones, wind, sound, ether, time… Drawing is a way to chart what is there, what might be there, what could be there." In works like "Uprooted", the very shadows cast on the walls are part of the work.

In 2007 Holten was commissioned by The Bronx Museum of the Arts, Wave Hill and the NYC Department of Parks & Recreation to create "Tree Museum", a public artwork celebrating the 2009 centennial of the Grand Concourse, Bronx, NY.   "She has marked out 100 trees along the Concourse, which is about four and a half miles long. Each one will have a sign that gives a phone number and a code to listen to short recordings of people speaking about the Bronx, their lives and their work."

Exhibitions 
2013
"Uprooted" in the Sensing Change Exhibit at the Chemical Heritage Foundation, Philadelphia, US. 
2012
"Drawn to the Edge" in New Orlean's Museum of Art, New Orleans, US (15 June – 9 September 2012) 
"Light and Landscape", Storm King Art Center, Mountainville, New York City (12 May – 11 November 2012) 
Katie Holten, FUTURA, Prague, Czech Republic (11 September – 25 November 2012)
2011
2010
The Golden Bough, Dublin City Gallery The Hugh Lane, Dublin, Ireland 
Solo exhibition, VAN HORN, Düsseldorf, Germany
2009
Green Platform, Palazzo Strozzi, Florence, Italy
Subversive Spaces, The Whitworth Art Gallery, University of Manchester, Manchester, UK
Public Art Commission, New York, The Bronx Museum of the Arts, Wave Hill, New York City Department of Parks and Recreation (solo)
Compilation IV, Kunsthalle Düsseldorf, Germany
2008
ATLAS of MEMORY, Nevada Museum of Art, Reno (solo)
IMPLANT, The Horticultural Society of New York at UBS, New York
Villa Merkel, Esslingen am Luckar, Germany (solo) 
Klemens Gasser & Tanja Grunert, Inc. New York City (solo) 
2007
Contemporary Art Museum St. Louis, Missouri, US (solo) 
VAN HORN, Düsseldorf, Germany (solo) 
Schuermann Berlin, Germany (solo)
Neuer Aachener Kunstverein, Aachen, Germany
Pforzheim Kunstverein, Germany
Angel Row Gallery, Nottingham, UK
2006
Institute of Contemporary Art, Philadelphia, Philadelphia, US
KBH Kunsthal, Copenhagen, Denmark (solo)
Fondation d'entreprise Ricard, Paris, France
Goettingen Kunstverein, Goettingen, Germany
GRAN BAZAAR, Centro Historico, Mexico City, Mexico (solo)
2005
Wiener Secession, Vienna, Austria
CREATIVE TIME, New York City
Wallspace Gallery, New York City
LMAK Projects, New York City
2003
Irish Pavilion, Venice Biennale, Italy
Butler Gallery, Kilkenny, Ireland
W139, Amsterdam, The Netherlands
2002
Temple Bar Gallery, Dublin, Ireland

Bibliography 
Katie Holten, a Van Horn Press book published by Revolver, Germany, 2007, 
Katie Holten: Paths of Desire, Contemporary Art Museum St. Louis, Missouri, 2007, 
GRAN BAZAAR, Tûp Institute and m o s t r a, printed in Mexico City, 2006, 
En Upassende Sandhed, Pork Salad Press, Copenhagen, 2006, 
notional, Coracle Press, Clonmel, 2003, 
Procumbent Notions, Pork Salad Press, Copenhagen, 2003, 
Katie Holten and others: Drawings, Instances, Collaborations + Texts, Tûp Institute and Temple Bar Gallery and Studio, Dublin, 2002,

References

External links 
 Katie Holten artist's website
 Gasser & Grunert New York gallery
 VAN HORN Düsseldorf, Germany
 Contemporary Art Museum St. Louis solo museum exhibition, 2007
 The New Yorker Talk of the Town piece by Ian Frazier, 2009
 ARTFORUM Review of solo exhibition, 2010
 katieholten.com/ARTFORUM

1975 births
Irish installation artists
Irish sculptors
Living people
Artists from Dublin (city)
Irish women artists
Alumni of the National College of Art and Design
Irish contemporary artists